Ameranna is a genus of sea snails, marine gastropod mollusks in the family Pisaniidae,.

Species
According to the World Register of Marine Species (WoRMS), the following species with valid names are included within the genus Anna :
 Ameranna florida (Garcia, 2008)
 Ameranna milleri (Nowell-Usticke, 1959)
 Ameranna royalensis (Watters, 2009)
 Ameranna willemsae (De Jong & Coomans, 1988)

References

 Landau, B.; Vermeij G. J. (2012). The genera Engina and Ameranna nov. gen. (Mollusca: Gastropoda, Buccinoidea, Buccinidae, Pisaniinae) from the Western Atlantic Neogene. Caenozoic Research. 9(1): 121-133.
page(s): 127

Pisaniidae
Gastropod genera